Spas Bayraktarov (born 7 May 1988) is a Bulgarian footballer currently playing for German side SV Thüle as a midfielder.

Career
Bayraktarov was raised in Levski Sofia's youth teams. Born in Plovdiv, he moved to Sofia at the age of 15. In June 2007 he signed his first professional contract with Lokomotiv Mezdra. One year later he moved to Varna and signed with local team Spartak. Bayraktarov made his debut in the A PFG in a game against Lokomotiv Mezdra on 9 August 2008. He played for 64 minutes. The result of the match was a 2:0 win for Spartak. In 2010, he moved to Botev Vratsa.

References

External links 
 Statistics at SV Thüle
 Profile at Footballdatabase

1988 births
Living people
Bulgarian footballers
First Professional Football League (Bulgaria) players
PFC Lokomotiv Mezdra players
PFC Spartak Varna players
OFC Vihren Sandanski players
FC Botev Vratsa players
Association football midfielders